Ratnachal Express (Train No: 12717/12718) is a daily Superfast Intercity Express train that runs between Vijayawada Junction and Visakhapatnam Junction in Andhra Pradesh. This train belongs to Vijayawada Division of South Central Railway Zone.

Halting stations 
The Ratnachal Express covers the distance of 349 km in 6 hours as 12717 Ratnachal Express averaging 59 km/hr. As it runs above 55 km/hr, it has superfast surcharge.
This train halts at Nuzvid, Eluru, Tadepalligudem, Nidadavolu, Rajahmundry, Anaparti, Samalkot, Annavaram, Tuni, Anakapalli, Duvvada.

Gallery

Coach Composition 
From Vijayawada to Visakhapatnam (12718) 
It runs with ICF-CBC coaches (Green indicating Electric locomotive, Yellow indicating colour of the general coaches, Pink indicating reserved coaches, Blue indicating AC coaches)

From Visakhapatnam to Vijayawada(12717) 
It runs with ICF-CBC coaches (Green indicating Electric locomotive, Yellow indicating colour of the general coaches, Pink indicating reserved coaches, Blue indicating AC coaches)

References 

Transport in Visakhapatnam
Transport in Vijayawada
Named passenger trains of India
Rail transport in Andhra Pradesh
Express trains in India
Railway services introduced in 1994